The 1992 Philips Open was a men's tennis tournament played on outdoor clay courts at the Nice Lawn Tennis Club in Nice, France, and was part of the ATP World Series of the 1992 ATP Tour. It was the 21st edition of the tournament and took place from 13 April through 19 April 1992. Unseeded Gabriel Markus, who defeated top-seeded Pete Sampras in the semifinal,  won the singles title.

Finals

Singles
 Gabriel Markus defeated  Javier Sánchez 6–4, 6–4
 It was Markus' only singles title of his career.

Doubles
 Patrick Galbraith /  Scott Melville defeated  Pieter Aldrich /  Danie Visser 6–1, 3–6, 6–4

References

External links
 ITF tournament edition details

Philips Open
1992
Philips Open
Philips Open
20th century in Nice